Dionysis Papagiannopoulos (12 July 1912 – 17 April 1984) was a Greek actor. He was born in Diakopto in the northeastern part of Achaea in 1912. He studied at the Drama School of the National Theatre of Greece (Ethniko Theatro) in Athens and made his stage debut in 1938, appearing as the Knight in William Shakespeare's King Lear. He excelled in Shakespeare's Hamlet as the Grave Digger and in Dimitris Psathas’ Fonazei o Kleftis as General Solon Karaleon.

Stage and screen
Dionysis Papagiannopoulos acted in all types of plays and appeared in more than 120 films in supporting and leading roles. One of his leading roles in cinema was O Kyr Giorgis Ekpaidevetai (Mr. Giorgis is being educated) (1977) which was the last film made by Finos Film and marked the end of an era. He also worked for television. One of his biggest successes was his role once again as Mr Giorgis for the television show Louna Park. He was generally considered as an actor with an enormous talent and incredible acting techniques. He always left a strong impression in all the roles he had, comical and dramatic. Remarkable was his work in the play To Megalo mas Tsirko by Iakovos Kambanelis, in which he portrayed Theodoros Kolokotronis, Eleftherios Venizelos and Karagiozis. Also he left a very good impression for his work in his last film, Voyage to Cythera directed by the famous Theo Angelopoulos.

He died suddenly at the age of 72, in his apartment on Alexandras Avenue, today to the Metro Station Ampelokipoi region, due to a stroke. The people of Diakopto erected a statue in his memory, although, during his life, some had opposed him due to political issues.

Filmography

Ta paidia tis Athinas (1947) .... Thanos
Matomena Hristougenna (1951) .... Condemned
To pontikaki (1954) .... Argyris
To stavrodromi tou pepromenou (1954)
Joe the Menace (1955) .... Chimpanzee
Stella (1955) .... Mitsos
Dva zrna grozdja (1955)
Tis tyhis ta grammena (1957)
Tria paidia Voliotika (1957)
Opou ftoheia kai filotimo (1957)
We Have Only One Life (1958) .... Daoglou
Haroumenoi alites (1958) .... Tenoro de Fiasko
O anemos tou misous (1958)
Mia Italida stin Ellada (1958)
Eglima sto Kolonaki (1959) .... Delios
Stournara 288 (1959) .... Agisilaos Papafronimopoulos
Erotikes istories (1959) .... Husband of Lambrini
O Ilias tou 16ou (1959) .... Labros
Maiden's Cheek (1959) .... Makrydakis
O Giannos ki i Pagona (1959)
O Ali Pasas kai i kyra Frosyni (1959) .... Ali Pasas
I Liza toskase (1959) .... Mr. Papadeas
Epistrofi ap' to metopo (1959)
Enas vlakas kai misos (1959) .... Sotiris Karamaounas
Bouboulina (1959) .... Mohamed
To koroidaki tis despoinidos (1960) .... Telis Karalis
To megalo kolpo (1960) .... Isidoros
Mia tou klefti (1960) .... Pafsanias
I Hionati kai ta 7 gerontopallikara (1960) .... Stylianos
To nisi tis agapis (1960) .... Alexis
Amartola niata (1960) .... Simademenos
I zoi mou arhizei me sena (1961) .... Commander
Myrtia (1961) .... Tsakalos
Exo oi kleftes (1961) .... Kleanthis Kleftodimos
Pagida (1962)
Irthes arga (1962) .... Alexis
To koritsi tou lohou (1962) .... Vasilis Georgiou
Ta hristougenna tou aliti (1962) .... Varanis
Pote de se xehasa (1962) .... Telis
O andras tis gynaikas mou (1962) .... Psychiatrist
Klapse, ftohi mou kardia (1962)
Exomologisis mias miteras (1962) .... Vlasis
Angeloi tou pezodromiou (1962)
Agni kai atimasmeni (1962) .... Miranda's Father
I pseftra (1963) .... Mr. Delipetros
Enas delikanis (1963) .... Mayor
Htypokardia sto thranio (1963) .... Mr. Nikiteas
To gelio vgike ap' ton Paradeiso (1963) .... Xenophon Haritidis
Skandala sto nisi tou erota (1963)
Osa kryvei i nyhta (1963)
O kos pterarhos (1963) .... Karatzovas
O adelfos mou... o trohonomos (1963) .... Kosmas Karabismanis
Lola (1964) .... Stelios
I villa ton orgion (1964) .... Lieutenant
I soferina (1964) .... Judge
Despoinis diefthyntis (1964) .... Mr. Thomas Vasileiou
Oi paides (1964)
O gyrismos tis manas (1964) .... Zafeiris
An eheis tyhi (1964) .... Alekos
Alygisti sti zoi (1964)
Fonazei o kleftis (1965) .... Solonas Karaleontas
Mia trelli... trelli oikogeneia (1965) .... Stelios
Yparhei kai filotimo (1965) .... Thodoros Grouezas
Merikes to protimoun haki (1965)
Kane me prothypourgo (1965) .... Kimon
Ftohos ekatommyriouhos (1965)
Exileosi (1965)
Jenny Jenny (1966) .... Kosmas Skoutaris
Dancing the Sirtaki (1966) .... Lefteris
Oi kyries tis avlis (1966) .... Nondas
O xypolytos pringips (1966) .... Klearhos
Oloi oi andres einai idioi (1966) .... Menelaos
O babas mou, o teddyboys (1966) .... Mr. Foteinos
I adelfi mou thelei xylo (1966) .... Mr. Fragopoulos
Fouskothalassies (1966) .... Nikolis Sfakianos
Ah! Kai na 'moun andras (1966) .... Othon Belalis
5.000 psemmata (1966) .... Aristeidis Fesarlis
Gabros ap' to Londino (1967) .... Kyriakos
O ahortagos (1967) .... Mihalis Kapantais
Kati kourasmena pallikaria (1967) .... Dr. Spiros
O gabros mou, o proikothiras (1967) .... Eftichios Chrysos
I paihnidiara (1967) .... Yakoumis Lorentzos
Gia tin kardia tis oraias Elenis (1967) .... Kleon Karamouzis
Erotes sti Lesvo (1967)
An milouse to parelthon mou (1967) .... Leonidas Stergiou
O pseftis (1968) .... Thomas Argyriou
To kanoni kai t' aidoni (1968) .... Triandafyllou
O Mikes pantrevetai (1968) .... Panagiotis Sinaxaridis
Enas ippotis gia ti Vasoula (1968) .... Captain Fatouros
Mermaids and Rascals (1968) .... Mr. Athanasiou
Gia poion htypa i... koudouna (1968) .... Apostolis Labirikos
I arhontissa ki o alitis (1968) .... Mr. Katsaros
Poly arga gia dakrya (1968) .... Mr. Menandros
Oikogeneia Horafa (1968) .... Deranged Scientist
Enas kleftis me filotimo (1968) .... Thanasis
Empaine, Kitso! (1968)
Doktor Zi-Vengos (1968) .... Apostolos
O gois (1969) .... John Christian
I neraida kai to palikari (1969) .... Fourtounakis
Xypna, koroido (1969) .... Kyriakos Balores
To nyfopazaro (1969)
O anthropos pou gyrise apo ta piata (1969) .... Spyros Lounas
Gia ena tagari dollaria (1969) .... Jenny's Father
Gabros ap' ti Gastouni (1969) .... Periklis Karabisbikis
Ena asyllipto koroido (1969) .... Mr. Haroupoglou
Zitountai gabroi me proika (1970) .... Evripidis Strouthambelos
Trella koritsia, apithana agoria (1970) .... Nionios Hionatos
O trellos tis plateias Agamon (1970) .... John Agras
Omorfes meres (1970) .... Pantelaras
O daskalakos itan leventia (1970) .... Babis Hanos
O apithanos (1970) .... Thomas Karalis
Natane to 13 napefte se mas! (1970) .... Tzevelakos
Giakoumis, mia romeiki kardia (1970) .... Grantis
Enas hippis me tsarouhia (1970) .... Pelopidas
O epanastatis popolaros (1971) .... Dimaras
Kafta... psyhra ki anapoda (1971) .... Kleanthis Toboglou
I zavoliara (1971)
Enas xenoiastos palaviaris (1971) .... Nikiforos
Diakopes stin Kypro mas (1971) .... Hatzigiannis
Lysistrata (1972) .... Provoulos
O magas me to trikyklo (1972) .... Papanastasiou
Yperohes nyfes... koroida gabroi! (1972) .... Arhelaos
Pio trelloi ki ap' tous trellous (1972) .... Pelopidas
O Patouhas (1972) .... Saitonikolis
O monahogios mou o... agathiaris (1972) .... Kleanthis
An imoun plousios! (1972) .... Aristeidis Tsitsis
O tsarlatanos (1973) .... Mpalamoutis
Louna Park, To (1974, TV Series) .... Kyr-Yorgis
Enas nomotagis politis (1974)
O Kyr Giorgis ekpaidevetai (1977) .... Giorgis Kollas
Kathenas me tin trella tou (1980) .... Iordanis
Koroido Romie! (1981) .... Fotis Firikis
Voyage to Cythera (1984) .... Antonis (final film role)

References

1912 births
1984 deaths
Greek male film actors
Greek comedians
Greek male stage actors
20th-century Greek male actors
20th-century comedians
People from Achaea